Asura Kingdom (Sonitpura Kingdom) is a mythological kingdom that is mentioned in a multiple of Hindu epics which later came to be associated with modern-day Tezpur in central Assam and Banasura Hill in Kerala. The kingdom was contemporary of Pragjyotisha. In Puranic literature, Pragjyotisha and Sonitpura were located to the northwest of the Indian subcontinent in what is modern-day Punjab and Sindh. In Assam, the name of the legendary kingdom might be applied to the local inhabitants who were outside of the Hindu fold. In Kalika purana, Banasura, the last ruler of the asura kingdom is represented as an anti-Brahminical character.

Dynasty

See also
Pragjyotisha Kingdom
Mahabharata

Notes

References

Kingdoms in the Mahabharata
Mythological kingdoms, empires, and countries